Ashley James Corker (born 18 September 1990) is an English part-time footballer currently at Joondalup City Football Club.

Career

Middlesbrough
Corker started his career at Middlesbrough, coming through their ever-producing academy. Once completing his scholarship with the club, he signed a one-year contract extension. He was released at the end of the season due to change of manager. Following this, Corker then spent a season playing the Northern Premier League.

Northampton Town
On 11 July 2011, he signed a one-year contract for Northampton Town following a successful trial.
On 6 August 2011, he made his debut for Northampton Town against Accrington Stanley, starting at left back. He was subbed off after 86 minutes for Bas Savage.
On 10 August 2011, he completed a full match for Northampton Town in the team that knocked-out Championship side Ipswich Town 2–1 at Portman Road in the League Cup first round.
On 31 January 2011 Corker and teammate Paul Walker were released by mutual consent from the Cobblers.

Cambridge United
Corker signed for Conference National side Cambridge United on 21 March 2012 until the end of the season. On 1 May 2012 it was announced that due to agreement between the player and U's boss Jez George Corker would not be taking up the one-year contract extension offer to remain at the U's for the 2012–13 season and he would be leaving the Abbey Stadium outfit with immediate effect.

Whitby Town
In September 2012, Corker joined Northern Premier League side Whitby Town.

Perth Soccer Club
On 10 April 2013, Corker joined Football West Premier League side Perth Soccer Club.

Joondalup City Football Club

in 2022, Ash Corker joins State League Division Two side Joondalup City under the management of head coach Bradley Hayward.

Career statistics

References

External links
Ashley Corker profile at ntfc.co.uk

 Perth SC

Northampton Town F.C. players
Cambridge United F.C. players
Whitby Town F.C. players
1990 births
Living people
English footballers
English Football League players
Association football fullbacks